The Shi Nai'an Literary Prize (施耐庵长篇叙事文学奖, abbreviated to 施耐庵文学奖) is awarded to a Chinese novel exhibiting an innovative style of narration. It is named after the Chinese author Shi Nai'an.

About the prize
This prize is awarded by the People's Government of Xinghua city, in Jiangsu province. It is named after Shi Nai'an, who was said to be from Xinghua. The prize aims to encourage depth and development in novels written in Chinese, and to promote the status of Chinese novels in the world. The prize was first awarded in 2011, and is awarded every two years.

Winners

Honour Titles
To encourage writers in Xinghua.

 Chinese literary awards